The Ministry of Foreign Affairs and Cooperation is the Benin government ministry which oversees the foreign relations of Benin.

See also 
 Foreign relations of Benin

References

External links
 Ministry of Foreign Affairs and African Integration

Foreign relations of Benin
Benin
Government of Benin